Caer Lêb is a Roman and mediaeval site on the Welsh island of Anglesey, west of Brynsiencyn. Its name means "Leaven Castle". It is a low-lying site near the Afon Braint with a double row of pentangular banks (some parts now levelled) and marshy ditches. The original entrance was on the east, other gaps are modern and caused by animals. Based on the excavation of a similar site elsewhere on Anglesey, it may date from the 2nd century BCE.

Excavations in 1865 found structures within the enclosure, rectangular buildings on the east and a circular one on the south. Nothing of these can now be seen on the ground. Pottery from the 2nd century to the 4th century was found, and on the north side a layer of periwinkle shells and a mediaeval coin, under a layer of peat.

There is a parking area, sufficient for 4-5 cars, by the roadside. A footpath goes southwest on a low ridge, some 2 metres above the Afon Braint, from Caer Lêb over stiles, past the site of the former stone circle of Tre'r Dryw Bach, some 800 metres to Castell Bryn Gwyn and on to the Bryn Gwyn stones and the A4080.

500 metres north-west along the road, by Pont Sarn Las (Green Causeway Bridge), the foundations of three round houses may be visible after a dry summer. A large settlement was recorded in the 19th century, and destroyed in the 1870s by agricultural improvement.

Gallery

References

External links

Prehistoric sites in Anglesey
Bronze Age sites in Wales
Cadw
Stone Age sites in Wales
Llanidan
Scheduled monuments in Anglesey